Misto may refer to:

 Misto, another term for Café au lait
 Misto (novel), a 1928 novel by Valerian Pidmohylny
Misto (animal), the result of a breeding between a male alpaca and a female llama (the opposite cross from a huarizo)

See also
 Mixed Group (Italian: Gruppo Misto), a parliamentary group active in both houses of the Italian Parliament